Hans Pulver (28 December 1902 – 8 April 1977) was a Swiss footballer who competed in the 1924 Summer Olympics. He was a member of the Swiss team, which won the silver medal in the football tournament.

He coached BSC Young Boys, FC Bern and FC Thun.

References

External links

1902 births
1977 deaths
Swiss men's footballers
Footballers at the 1924 Summer Olympics
Olympic footballers of Switzerland
Olympic silver medalists for Switzerland
Switzerland international footballers
Swiss football managers
BSC Young Boys managers
FC Thun managers
Olympic medalists in football
FC Bern managers
Medalists at the 1924 Summer Olympics
Association football goalkeepers